Alina Marushchak (born 6 March 1997 in Pylypy-Khrebtiyivski, Khmelnytskyi Oblast) is a Ukrainian weightlifter. In 2021, she won the gold medal in the women's 81kg event at both the World Weightlifting Championships in Tashkent, Uzbekistan and the European Weightlifting Championships in Moscow, Russia.

She also won the silver medal in the under-23 women's 71kg event at the 2019 European Junior & U23 Weightlifting Championships in Bucharest, Romania.

Marushchak won silver medal at the 2022 European Championships in Tirana, Albania, finishing second behind her team fellow Iryna Dekha.

Major results

References

External links 
 

Living people
1997 births
Sportspeople from Khmelnytskyi Oblast
Ukrainian female weightlifters
European Weightlifting Championships medalists
World Weightlifting Championships medalists
21st-century Ukrainian women